Nygren may refer to:

People
Anders Nygren (1890–1978), Swedish Lutheran theologian
Carl S. Nygren (1873–1941), American farmer and politician
David R. Nygren (born 1938), American particle physicist, inventor of the Time projection chamber
Erik Nygren (1923–1999), Swedish Air Force major general
Harley D. Nygren (1924–2019), American admiral and engineer, first Director of the National Oceanic and Atmospheric Administration Commissioned Officer Corps
John Nygren (born 1964), American insurance and financial services agent and Republican politician
Magnus Nygren (born 1990), Swedish ice hockey defenceman
Nicklas Nygren (born 1983), Swedish video game developer
Olle Nygren (born 1929), Swedish former international speedway rider
Oscar Nygren (1872–1960), Swedish Army general
Wollert Nygren (1906–1988), Norwegian Olympic speed skater

Geography
Mount Nygren, a mountain in Antarctica
Nygren Point, a point on James Ross Island, Antarctica

See also
Negreni (disambiguation)
Nygrenda
Nygränd